Keo Saphal may refer to:
 Keo Saphal (Siem Reap politician), Cambodian politician who represents Siem Reap in the National Assembly
 Keo Saphal (Takeo politician), Cambodian politician who represents Takeo in the National Assembly